This list of Massachusetts State Parks contains the state parks and recreation areas in the Commonwealth of Massachusetts managed by the Massachusetts Department of Conservation and Recreation as of 2015.

The Bureau of State Parks and Recreation division of Department of Conservation and Recreation (Massachusetts) (DCR)  is responsible for the maintenance and management of over 450,000 acres (1,820 sq km) of privately and state-owned forests and parks, nearly 10% of the Commonwealth's total land mass. Within the lands managed by the Bureau of State Parks and Recreation are some 29 campgrounds, over 2,000 miles (3,200 km) of trails, 87 beaches, 37 swimming, wading, and spray pools, 62 playgrounds, 55 ballfields, and 145 miles (233 km) of paved bike and rail trails.

DCR's Bureau of Urban Parks and Recreation manages the Metropolitan Park System of Greater Boston, the components of which are included in this list.

State parks

State trails

Other trails

See also
List of National Natural Landmarks in Massachusetts
List of Massachusetts state forests

References

External links
 Department of Conservation and Recreation website
 DCR page regarding fees and passes

 
State parks
Massachusetts
Park
State parks

 Park